Toreo may refer to:

Bullfighting
Sildenafil mouth spray, by trade name
Toreo de Cuatro Caminos, a former bullring and landmark area in Naucalpan, State of Mexico
Cuatro Caminos metro station (Naucalpan), a Mexico City Metro station commonly known as Toreo
Toreo Parque Central, a mixed-use shopping center built where the bullring stood